The Juba tanker explosion was a tank truck explosion that occurred 17 September 2015 in a suburb of Juba, the capital of South Sudan. It killed an estimated 176 people, most casualties coming from the crowd that had converged on the scene of the leaking tanker. The Red Cross dispatched aid to the suburb of Maridi after the incident. The death toll increased to 183 people being dead from the incident. It soon increased to 193 people dead.

References

Explosions in 2015
Tanker explosions
Road incidents in South Sudan
2015 road incidents
2015 in South Sudan
September 2015 events in Africa
Deaths caused by petroleum looting